Homeland (Domovina) was an electoral alliance in Republika Srpska, forming a joint parliamentary group in the National Assembly.

The alliance was formed to contest the elections in Republika Srpska, and consists of the Democratic Front, the Union for a Better Future of BiH, the Party of Democratic Action, the Party for Bosnia and Herzegovina, the Croatian Party of Rights, the Diaspora Party of Bosnia and Herzegovina and the Posavina Party.

In the elections in 2014 the alliance received 5.3% of the vote, winning five seats in the National Assembly.

Member parties

References

Political party alliances in Bosnia and Herzegovina
Political parties in Republika Srpska